Yagya Bahadur Basnyat was a Nepalese politician. He was appointed Minister of Health & Local Self Development in the government formed by Sir Mohan Shamsher Jang Bahadur Rana after King Tribhuvan's return to the throne on 18 February 1951. In a cabinet reshuffle on 10 June 1951, he was named Minister of Health. This cabinet lasted until November 1951.

References

Government ministers of Nepal
Possibly living people
Year of birth missing